The Men's individual competition at the Biathlon World Championships 2021 was held on 17 February 2021.

Results
The race was started at 14:30.

References

Men's individual